Randall John Gregg (born February 19, 1956) is a Canadian former professional ice hockey defenceman who spent 10 seasons in the National Hockey League, and is a family physician in Edmonton. He is best known for his time with the Edmonton Oilers, where he spent most of his career and won five Stanley Cups, in 1984, 1985, 1987, 1988 and 1990.

Playing career
Gregg attended the University of Alberta to work toward a medical degree, and playing hockey was a secondary priority. However, he became one of the top players in Canadian university hockey, leading the Golden Bears to two Canadian Interuniversity Athletics Union (CIAU) championships, and was CIAU Player of the Year in 1979. He received a contract offer from the New York Rangers but rejected it to spend the year with Father David Bauer and the Canadian national team, and captained Canada's entry at the 1980 Winter Olympics in Lake Placid.

Following the 1980 Olympics, Gregg took the unusual step of signing in Japan as a player-coach, and spent two full seasons playing there. He was at last convinced to accept an NHL offer by his hometown Edmonton Oilers, and joined the team for the 1982 playoffs, appearing in 4 games.

In 1982–83, Gregg emerged as a regular on the Oilers' blueline, appearing in all 80 games and registering 6 goals and 28 points. Receiving as much notoriety from the fact that he had a medical degree as he did for his solid play on the blueline, he helped the Oilers reach the Stanley Cup finals in 1983. In 1983–84, he would have his finest NHL season, as he recorded career highs of 12 goals and 40 points, and then contributed 10 points in 19 playoff games  to help Edmonton win their first Stanley Cup. Following the season, he was selected to represent Canada at the 1984 Canada Cup tournament.

Gregg continued to be a solid contributor over the next few seasons for the Oilers as they dominated the NHL and won the 1985 Stanley Cup, although he would be slowed somewhat by injuries. However, hockey was still something of a temporary career for Gregg, and he was conflicted about when he should leave the sport and take up his medical career . He retired after the Oilers' disappointing loss in the 1986 playoffs, but changed his mind six weeks into the season and helped Edmonton win their third championship in 1986–87. He retired from professional hockey again for the 1987–88 campaign to enter a residency program in orthopedic surgery as well as represent Canada at the 1988 Winter Olympics, but re-joined Edmonton for the playoffs to win another Stanley Cup.

Gregg spent two more years with the Oilers as a solid depth defender, helping the team win their fifth Stanley Cup in seven years in 1990. He was one of seven players to play for all five championship teams. Exposed in the NHL Waiver Draft in 1990, he was claimed by the Vancouver Canucks but decided again to retire. However, after a year away from the sport, he signed with the Canucks for the 1991–92 campaign, appearing in 21 games and providing valued veteran leadership for a young improving team, before retiring for good following the season.

Gregg appeared in 474 NHL games, recording 41 goals and 152 assists for 193 points along with 333 penalty minutes. He also appeared in 137 playoff games, totaling 13 goals and 40 assists for 53 points.

Following his retirement, Gregg completed his residency training program at the University of Alberta.  He is a family physician, operating a successful sports medicine practice in Edmonton. He briefly worked at TSN as the third string color commentator for NHL games in 1994–95.

Personal life
Gregg married American-born Canadian Olympic speed-skater Kathy Vogt on June 9, 1984, in Edmonton. They have four children: Ryan, Sarah, and speed-skaters Jessica Gregg and Jamie Gregg. Gregg and his family reside in Edmonton, Alberta.

Awards and achievements
1983–84 - NHL - Stanley Cup (Edmonton)
1984–85 - NHL - Stanley Cup (Edmonton)
1986–87 - NHL - Stanley Cup (Edmonton)
1987–88 - NHL - Stanley Cup (Edmonton)
1989–90 - NHL - Stanley Cup (Edmonton)

Legacy
The Dr. Randy Gregg Award is presented annually by Canadian Interuniversity Sport (CIS) to reward excellence in the student-athlete. The Canadian University ice hockey player who receives this award has exhibited outstanding achievement in ice hockey, academics, and community involvement.

Career statistics

Regular season and playoffs

International

References

External links

Oilers Heritage profile of Gregg

1956 births
Alberta Golden Bears ice hockey players
Canadian ice hockey defencemen
Canadian general practitioners
Edmonton Oilers players
Ice hockey people from Edmonton
Ice hockey players at the 1980 Winter Olympics
Ice hockey players at the 1988 Winter Olympics
Kokudo Keikaku players
Living people
Olympic ice hockey players of Canada
Stanley Cup champions
Undrafted National Hockey League players
University of Calgary
Vancouver Canucks players